Bhograi is a Vidhan Sabha constituency of Balasore district, Odisha.

Area of this constituency includes Bhograi block.

In 2009 election, Biju Janata Dal candidate Ananta Das defeated Indian National Congress candidate Kartikeswar Patra by a margin of 17,650 votes.

Elected Members

15 elections held during 1951 to 2014. Elected members from the Bhograi constituency are:
2019: (36): Ananta Das (BJD)
2014: (36): Ananta Das (BJD)
2009: (36): Ananta Das (BJD)
2004: (11): Ananta Das (BJD)
2000: (11): Kamala Das (BJD)
1995: (11): Kamala Das (Janata Dal)
1990: (11): Kamala Das (Janata Dal)
1985: (11): Umarani Patra (Congress)
1980: (11): Kartikeswara Patra (Congress-I)
1977: (11): Susant Chand (Janata Party)
1974: (11): Kartikeswara Patra (Congress)
1971: (11): Kartikeswara Patra (CPI)
1967: (11): Pyari Mohan Das (PSP)
1961: (129): Pyari Mohan Das (PSP)
1957: (92): Durgasankara Das (Congress)
1951: (52): Sasikanta Bhanja (Independent)

2019 Election Result

2014 Election Result
In 2014 election, Biju Janata Dal candidate Ananta Das defeated Indian National Congress candidate Satyashib Das by a margin of 19,512 votes.

Summary of results of the 2009 Election

Notes

References

Assembly constituencies of Odisha
Balasore district